Cheia may refer to several places in Romania:

 Cheia, a mountain resort in Prahova County
 Cheia Monastery, a monastery in Prahova County
 Cheia, a village in Râmeț Commune, Alba County
 Cheia, a village in Moieciu Commune, Braşov County
 Cheia, a village in Mihai Viteazu Commune, Cluj County
 Cheia, a village in Grădina Commune, Constanța County
 Cheia, a village in Măneciu Commune, Prahova County, the site of Cheia resort
 Cheia, a village in Băile Olănești Commune, Vâlcea County
 Cheia (Arieș), a tributary of the Arieș in Alba County
 Cheia (Olănești), a tributary of the Olănești in Vâlcea County
 Valea Cheii (Dâmbovița), a tributary of the Dâmbovița in Argeș County
 Cheia Păscoaia, a tributary of the Păscoaia in Vâlcea County

See also 
 Râul Cheii (disambiguation)
 Valea Cheii (disambiguation)